Patna district is one of the thirty-eight districts of Bihar state in eastern India. Patna, the capital of Bihar, is the district headquarters. The Patna district is a part of Patna division. The Patna district is divided into 6 Sub-divisions (Tehsils) i.e. Patna Sadar, Patna City, Barh, Masaurhi, Danapur and Paliganj. 

As of 2011, it is the most populous district of Bihar and fifteenth most populous district in India.

The revenue district of Patna comes under the jurisdiction of a District Collector (District Magistrate). The office of the Patna DM is in Patna Collectorate.

History
Patna is one of the oldest continuously inhabited places in the world. Patna was founded in 490 BCE by the king of Magadha. Ancient Patna, known as Pataliputra, was the capital of the Magadha Empire under the Haryanka, Nanda, Mauryan, Shunga, Gupta and Pala empires. Pataliputra was a seat of learning and fine arts. Patliputra was home to many mathematicians, astronomers, astrologists and scholars including Gautam Buddha, Aryabhata, Panini, Vātsyāyana, Chanakya and Kālidāsa. Its population during the Maurya period (around 400 BCE) was about 400,000. Patna served as the seat of power, political and cultural centre of the Indian subcontinent. With the fall of Gupta Empire, Patna lost its glory. It was revived again in the 17th century by the British as a centre of international trade.

Modern history
The modern district of Patna was created in September 1770 as provincial council by the British, to supervise revenue matters of Bihar. In 1793, Patna became a separate judicial district. This led the foundation of modern district.

The re-organization of the districts in the State took effect in 1972. On November 9, 1972 Nalanda district was constituted by carving out the Bihar Sharif sub-division of Patna district.

Geography
In the south, it is bordered by the Nalanda, Arwal, by Jehanabad districts, in the east by Begusarai district, and by Lakhisarai to the southeast.

Administration
The Patna district is headed by an IAS officer of the rank of District Magistrate (DM). The district is divided into sub-divisions or Tehsils, each headed by a Sub Divisional Magistrate (SDM). 

These Tehsils are further divided into Blocks,  each headed by a Block development officer (BDO).

Tehsils
The six sub-divisions or Tehsils in Patna district are as follows:
Patna Sadar
Patna City
Barh
Masaurhi
Danapur
Paliganj

Blocks
The 23 Blocks in Patna district are as follows: Patna Sadar, Sampatchak, Phulwari Sharif,
Fatuha, Daniyawaan, Khusrupur, Athmalgola, Mokama, Belchi, Ghoswari, Pandarak, Bakhtiyarpur, Barh, Masaurhi, Punpun, Dhanarua, Danapur, Maner, Bihta, Naubatpur, Paliganj, Dulhin Bazar and Bikram.

Industries
In Patna the most Industries are located in Fatuha to DidarGanj.

Demographics

Its population growth rate over the decade 2001–2011 was 22.34%. Patna has a sex ratio of 897 females for every 1,000 males, and a literacy rate of 70.68%. 43.07% of the population lives in urban areas. Scheduled Castes and Scheduled Tribes make up 15.77% and 0.15% of the population respectively.

At the time of the 2011 Census of India, 46.35% of the population in the district spoke Magahi, 43.77% Hindi, 5.19% Urdu, 2.67% Bhojpuri and 1.24% Maithili as their first language.

Climate

Economy
In 2006 the Ministry of Panchayati Raj named Patna one of the country's 250 most backward districts. It is one of the 38 districts in Bihar currently receiving funds from the Backward Regions Grant Fund.

Agricultural products include paddy, maize, pulses, wheat, and oilseeds. Roughly one-third of the area sown is under rice (paddy). Cash crops such as vegetables and watermelons are also grown in the Diara belt.  Major industries include leather, handicrafts, and agro-processing.

Politics

Assembly
The district is divided into fourteen assembly constituencies:
 178 Mokama
 179 Barh
 180 Bakhtiarpur
 181 Digha
 182 Bankipur
 183 Kumhrar
 184 Patna Sahib
 185 Fatuha
 186 Danapur
 187 Maner
 188 Phulwari (SC)
 189 Masaurhi (SC)
 190 Paliganj
 191 Bikram

Parliamentary
The district has three parliament constituencies:
30 Patna Sahib (Lok Sabha constituency), covers Bakhtiarpur, Digha, Bankipur, Kumhrar, Patna Sahib and Fatuha.
31 Pataliputra (Lok Sabha constituency), covers Danapur, Maner, Phulwari, Masaurhi, Paliganj, and Bikram.
28 Munger/Monghyr (Lok Sabha constituency), covers Barh and Mokama and shared with Munger district.

-Numbers denote constituency number.

Education

Schools in Patna are either government run schools or private schools. Schools mainly use Hindi or English as the medium of instruction. Under the 10+2+3/4 plan, after completing their secondary education, students typically enrol in a school with a higher secondary facility affiliated with the Bihar School Examination Board, the Central Board of Secondary Education, the National Institute of Open Schooling, or the Council for the Indian School Certificate Examinations.

List of villages
The Patna district has 1,395 villages and 322 Gram Panchayats under all 23 Blocks. The list of villages in Patna Sadar Block is as follows:

 Alipur ullar
 Digha East
 Digha West
 Fatehpur
 Mahuli
 Mainpura East
 Mainpura North 
 Mainpura West
 Marchi
 Nakta Diyara
 Punadih
 Sabalpur
 Sonawapur

See also

Patna Police
Patna Metropolitan Region

References

External links
 Official website

 
Patna division
Districts of Bihar